The 1952–53 Drexel Dragons men's basketball team represented Drexel Institute of Technology during the 1952–53 men's basketball season. The Dragons, led by 1st year head coach Samuel Cozen, played their 6 of their home games at Sayre High School, and the other 3 at Curtis Hall Gym, and were members of the Southern division of the Middle Atlantic Conferences (MAC).

Roster

Schedule

|-
!colspan=9 style="background:#F8B800; color:#002663;"| Regular season
|-

References

Drexel Dragons men's basketball seasons
Drexel
1952 in sports in Pennsylvania
1953 in sports in Pennsylvania